Donna Marie Vakalis is a Canadian modern pentathlete. At the 2012 Summer Olympics, she competed in the women's competition, finishing in 29th place.

Athletic career
Vakalis became a member of the Canadian national modern pentathlon team in 2009. She qualified for the 2012 Olympics after finishing 20th at the UIPM World Cup Final in Chengdu.

Her personal best is 5348 points, achieved at the 2012 Guatemala Open (where she placed first).

In June 2016, she was named to Canada's Olympic team.

Personal life
Vakalis attended McMaster University in Hamilton, Ontario, receiving an honours bachelor's degree of arts and science. She received a professional master's degree in architecture from the University of Toronto, and began PhD studies there in 2012. Her dissertation is on assessing building projects for the impacts on health and environment.

References

External links
 

1979 births
Living people
Sportspeople from Toronto
Canadian female modern pentathletes
Olympic modern pentathletes of Canada
Modern pentathletes at the 2012 Summer Olympics
Modern pentathletes at the 2016 Summer Olympics
Pan American Games competitors for Canada
Modern pentathletes at the 2011 Pan American Games
Modern pentathletes at the 2015 Pan American Games
World Modern Pentathlon Championships medalists
20th-century Canadian women
21st-century Canadian women